Roland Peqini (born 25 December 1990) is a former Albanian professional footballer who played as a defender.

Club career

Tërbuni Pukë
In July 2015, Peqini completed a transfer to newly promoted top flight side Tërbuni Pukë for an undisclosed fee. He made his debut on 23 August by starting in team's first ever Albanian Superliga match against Tirana which finished in a 1–2 home defeat, despite taking the lead. Peqini made 16 league appearances, in addition 2 in cup, before leaving in the first days in January.

Return to Kukësi
On 4 January 2016, Peqini agreed terms with his former club Kukësi where he signed a contract until the end of the season, returning to the team for a third time. However, his third spell with the club was short-lived, as he was suddenly released after only 14 days. Speaking on that, he accused the team's coach Klodian Duro as the main reason of his departure, by saying: "it was him [Duro] who brought me to Kukësi and was him who removed me from the team."

Return to Dinamo Tirana
On 23 January 2016, Peqini joined Albanian First Division strugglers Dinamo Tirana on an 18-month contract, returning to the capital club after four years absence. He was assigned squad number 15 and made his return debut on 13 February in a 1–0 away defeat to Butrinti Sarandë, playing full-90 minutes.

Elbasani
On 11 September 2016, Peqini joined the fellow Albanian First Division side Elbasani on a free transfer, signing a one-year contract. He left the club on 29 January of the following year after 12 league appearances due to club financial problems.

Third spell at Dinamo Tirana
On 1 February 2017, after leaving Elbasani, Peqini returned to Dinamo on a free transfer by signing until the end of the season. After two matches as an unused substitute, Peqini appeared on the matchday 16 against Pogradeci, entering as a substitute in the 25th minute to fill the blank left by the dismissal of Julian Brahja, with the finishing in a 0–1 home defeat. He concluded the second part of 2016–17 season with 8 league appearances as Dinamo once again escape relegation. He agreed a contract extension for another season in August 2017, and was also named club captain.

Retirement
On 3 July 2018, Peqini announced his retirement from the sport at the age of 27, citing his injuries as the main reason.

International career
Peqini has been a former Albania U21 member, ammasing 9 appearances from 2010 to 2012. He made his first appearance on 26 May 2010 in a friendly versus Poland which ended in a 2–2 draw.

Career statistics

Honours

Club
Dinamo Tirana
 Albanian Superliga: 2009–10

References

External links

1990 births
Living people
Footballers from Elbasan
Albanian footballers
Albania under-21 international footballers
Association football defenders
FK Dinamo Tirana players
KF Apolonia Fier players
FK Kukësi players
KF Tirana players
KF Tërbuni Pukë players
KF Elbasani players
Kategoria Superiore players
Kategoria e Parë players